Desroches Island or Île Desroches is the main island of the Amirante Islands, part of the Outer Islands of the Seychelles.

It is located 227 km southwest of Victoria, Seychelles. It is 5.5 km long and has a land area of 4.027 km2. Along its circumference of 13 km is a beach of fine sand. Conservation on the island is managed by Island Conservation Society.

History
The island was named Île des Roches in 1771 by La Biolière, captain of the French ship Étoile du Matin, in honour of François Julien des Roches, Governor of Île de France (now Mauritius) and Île Bourbon (now Réunion) from 1767 to 1772.
It was explored by the Chevalier de la Billioère in 1771. The British had originally named it Wood Island because of its dense tree vegetation. The island was an important producer of copra.
in 1835 the first settlement was established
Along with the remaining Amirante Islands, Desroches had been a part of the Seychelles since it became a separate colony in 1909. On 8 November 1965 the United Kingdom split Desroches from the Seychelles to become part of the newly created British Indian Ocean Territory together with Farquhar, Aldabra and the Chagos Archipelago, but returned it to the Seychelles with the first two. The purpose was to allow the construction of a military base for the mutual benefit of the United Kingdom and the United States. On 23 June 1976 Desroches was returned to Seychelles as a result of it attaining independence. In 1972, a tourist lodge was built on the island, on Lodge Beach. In 1988, the Lodge changed hands to MK resorts which renovated it to a Luxury resort with 20 rooms.
In 2005, the resort was sold to Collins Properties which renovated it and added a spa 
In 2008 Island Conservation Society opened a Conservation Centre at Desroches. Turtle monitoring, bird monitoring and island rehabilitation projects were implemented and an endowment fund established to provide funds to protect the environment.

The LUX managed resort was expanded to 60 rooms in 2008, and in 2016 the resort was sold to Four Seasons hotels.
Four Seasons are adding more rooms in Lodge beach, but the Madame Zabre Beach units are sold as residential buildings, and a new neighborhood will be formed in this area by 2017.

Geography
It lies on the southern edge of a reef of atoll character. The island is low and is covered with coconut palms and tall hardwood trees.

Demographics
Desroches has a population of about 100. The Collins group hotel formerly had 30 rooms in the south (former location of Desroches Island Resort), built in 1988, and 1 presidential villa at Madame Zabre Beach 
There is a lighthouse on the northeast end, at Helene point, of the Desroches Island.

Administration
The island belongs to Outer Islands District. 
Being an island with a small population, there are not any government buildings or services. For many services, people have to go to Victoria, which is a difficult task.

Transport
The island has regular service aircraft from Mahé.

Economics
The inhabitants of the island engage mainly in tourism, and in small scale farming and fishing which are mainly for local consumption.

Flora and fauna
In 2007, Island Conservation Society opened a conservation center on the island, employing full-time staff.
There are no endemic land birds, only introduced species. Around the hotel and village there are populations of house sparrows and zebra doves and in the woods Madagascar fodies and the more retiring grey francolin. Much of the island is covered in coconut trees but well-wooded pockets of forest remain. The long, encircling beach and beach-crest of Desroches are of national importance for both green turtle and hawksbill turtle, particularly on the south and northeast coasts. The only known endemic of the Amirantes, a species of cockroach Delosia ornata, is found here.

Small numbers of wedge-tailed shearwaters breed despite the presence of rats.

Image gallery

References

External links 

 Island guide 2
 National Bureau of Statistics
 Desroches Island Resort
 An Article on the Desroches Island Resort - a Hideaways article about the resort at Desroches.

Islands of Outer Islands (Seychelles)
Former islands of the British Indian Ocean Territory
Atolls of Seychelles